Kate Brookes-Peterson (born 14 May 1984 in Kawakawa, New Zealand) is an Australian open water swimmer.

She won Australia's first medal at the 2007 FINA World Championships with a bronze in the Women's 5 km open water event. Her result was not without controversy though with German Britta Kamrau-Corestein, whom she beat home for bronze by 0.1 seconds, accusing her of foul play by pulling on her swimming costume. Brookes-Peterson flatly denied the accusation.

She was coached by Australian swimming coach Ken Wood.

References 

1984 births
Living people
Australian female swimmers
Female long-distance swimmers
New Zealand emigrants to Australia
World Aquatics Championships medalists in open water swimming